USS John Adams (SSBN-620), a Lafayette-class ballistic missile submarine, was the second ship of the United States Navy to be named for Founding Father John Adams (1735–1826), the second President of the United States (1797–1801), and his son John Quincy Adams (1767–1848), the sixth President of the United States (1825–1829). Both names were used with the captains of the Blue and Gold crews alternately using the names John Adams and John Quincy Adams.

Construction and commissioning
The contract to build John Adams was awarded to Portsmouth Naval Shipyard in Kittery, Maine, on 23 July 1960 and her keel was laid down there on 19 May 1961.  She was launched on 12 January 1963 sponsored by Abigail Adams Manny, great, great, great-granddaughter of John Quincy Adams, and wife of James C. Manny, and commissioned on 12 May 1964, with Commander Lando W. Zech, Jr. in command of the Blue Crew and Commander Paul J. Early in command of the Gold Crew.

Operational history
Following her commissioning, John Adams completed sixteen deterrent patrols while assigned to the United States Atlantic Fleet After her sixteenth patrol, she entered Puget Sound Naval Shipyard in Bremerton, Washington for overhaul and modernization in August 1968. She completed overhaul on 10 August 1969 and returned to sea as a unit of the United States Pacific Fleet. Both the Blue Crew and the Gold Crew shot two Polaris ballistic missiles during a Demonstration and Shakedown Operation (DASO) following the overhaul.  She conducted sixteen more deterrent patrols as a unit of the Pacific Fleet.

Upon completion of her thirty-second deterrent patrol, John Adams entered Portsmouth Naval Shipyard at Kittery for her second overhaul and conversion to the Poseidon missile system. She completed the overhaul and returned to sea once again as a unit of the Atlantic Fleet.

After completing an additional forty-three deterrent patrols from both her home port at Charleston, South Carolina, and from Holy Loch, Scotland, John Adams transited the Panama Canal to again enter the Puget Sound Navy Shipyard, this time in preparation for decommissioning after a long and distinguished career. At the time of her decommissioning she had completed 75 strategic deterrent patrols.

Decommissioning and disposal
John Adams was decommissioned on 24 March 1989 and stricken from the Naval Vessel Register the same day. She entered the Nuclear-Powered Ship and Submarine Recycling Program at Bremerton, Washington.  Recycling of Ex-John Adams was completed on 12 February 1996.

Notes

References 

 

Ships built in Kittery, Maine
Lafayette-class submarines
Cold War submarines of the United States
Nuclear submarines of the United States Navy
1963 ships
Ships named for Founding Fathers of the United States